Cari Batson Thomas is a retired rear admiral of the United States Coast Guard and a 1984 graduate of the U. S. Coast Guard Academy. On January 22, 2010, Thomas became the third female commander of USCG Training Center Cape May to be advanced to a flag officer. Her final assignment was Assistant Commandant for Human Resources at the Coast Guard Academy.

Since retirement, she has served as executive director of the Navy League and on the board of the Defense Advisory Committee on Women in the Services. She currently serves as the CEO of the Coast Guard Mutual Assistance Association and as an IMO Maritime Ambassador.

Coast Guard career
Cari Thomas served aboard cutters Vigorous, Valiant, and commanded Manitou. Additionally, other operational assignments included Group-Air Station Atlantic City and as plankowner and Commander, Sector Miami, Response Operations. Some of her responsibilities included transitions to the RB-S, 47' MLB, 49' BUSL, and 87' CPB as well as numerous USCG, joint DOD, and interagency operations in the Northwest Atlantic, Gulf of Mexico, Caribbean, Bahamas, Straits of Florida, New Jersey coast and Delaware Bay. Thomas also served in the Enlisted Personnel Division of the Personnel Command, Admissions at the Coast Guard Academy, as a Program Reviewer at Headquarters and as the Executive Assistant to the Atlantic Area, Fifth District and Maritime Defense Zone Atlantic Commanders. She was able to gain experience in leading new Department of Homeland Security response regimes, she served two years as the Chief of Staff to Principal Federal Official (PFO), Northeast Region and as the predesignated Deputy PFO, Florida (collateral duty), Atlantic Area Resource Director, and as commander, Training Center Cape May.

As a flag officer, she served as Assistant Commandant, Response Policy (CG-5R), Commander, Coast Guard District Fourteen, and Assistant Commandant, Human Resources (CG-1).

Thomas graduated with distinction from the Naval War College with a Master of Arts in National Security and Strategic Studies. She also holds a Master of Science in Educational Leadership from Troy State University and a Bachelor of Science in Civil Engineering from the Coast Guard Academy. She served on the board of directors for the Academy Alumni Association, and participated in various Coast Guard studies, including Project Kimball, Academy Task Force and as co-lead for the Force Readiness Command design team. Her awards include two Legions of Merit, five Meritorious Service Medals, the State Department Superior Honor Award, and the Sea Services Leadership Association North Star award, among many other personal, unit and campaign awards. She earned permanent cutterman status in 1994.

Family

Thomas' husband is Commander Gary Thomas, USCG (Retired), who was a former chief of electronic navigation and oversaw the  decommissioning of Loran-C transmissions by the Coast Guard. While RADM Thomas served as Fourteenth District Commander, Gary proudly accepted his role as a Coast Guard spouse, actively participating with the Coast Guard Spouses’ Association of Oahu. As is customary for the D14 Commander, they were billeted at the Diamond Head Lighthouse, and he was always quick to correct guests who mistakenly believed he was the Admiral and commented how lucky his wife must be at his assignment. They have one adult daughter, Andi.

References

Year of birth missing (living people)
Living people
United States Coast Guard Academy alumni
Troy University alumni
Naval War College alumni
United States Coast Guard admirals
Female admirals of the United States Coast Guard
21st-century American women